Mycobacterium lepromatosis is an aerobic, acid-fast bacillus (AFB), and the second known causative agent of Hansen's disease (leprosy). It was discovered in 2008. Analysis of the 16S rRNA gene confirms that the species is distinct from Mycobacterium leprae.

Characteristics 
Members of the Mycobacterium genus are characterized by being Gram-positive, non-motile, non-spore-forming, and possess a bacilliary cell shape. Bacteria in the Mycobacterium genus are characteristically known for possessing an outer membrane, capsules, as well as a uniquely thick, waxy, hydrophobic cell wall abundant in mycolic acids. Many species of Mycobacterium are opportunistic pathogenic bacteria and can cause serious disease.

The 16S ribosomal RNA (rRNA), a genetic marker of bacterial evolution is used in establishing phylogenetic relationships due to its highly conserved nature. 16S rRNA sequencing of M. lepromatosis displays a 2.1% genomic discrepancy from other Mycobacterium. The rpoB and hspa5 gene sequences were also analyzed, displaying speciation from its two most related ancestors of Mycobacterium, M. leprae and M. tuberculosis. M. lepromatosis exemplifies a 9.1% deviance from M. leprae in nucleotide structure, evidence of a novel bacterium. A phylogenetic analysis of 20 genes and pseudogenes, isolated to 5 conserved protein genes, was used to construct phylogenetic trees displaying long terminal branches from the nodes, suggesting speciation occurred long ago.

Disease 
Mycobacterium lepromatosis can induce diffuse lepromatous leprosy (DLL), typically known to occur in Mexico and the Caribbean. DLL is a severe form of leprosy which manifests through nerve invasion and extensive skin ulcerations due to massive AFB burden in internal organs. M. lepromatosis, like M. leprae, has not been cultured in the laboratory because they both lack genes necessary to grow outside their hosts. These genes are believed to have been lost through reductive evolution.

The novel bacterium was discovered in 2008 following the autopsy of 2 deceased patients from Mexico. Similar to its close relative, Mycobacterium leprae, M. lepromatosis is a facultative intracellular parasite, able to reproduce in and outside of host cells, a fact that researchers have speculated is why bacterial culturing in the laboratory has been unsuccessful. Visually indistinguishable from its close relative, M. leprae, M. lepromatosis is an aerobic bacillus, requiring an oxygenated environment, is rod-shaped, consistent with all bacillus bacteria, and is resistant to acids due to the presence of mycolic acids in the cell wall. This prohibits the standard use of the Gram stain in characterization.

References 

lepromatosis
Leprosy